Upton Apartments is a historic building in Ogden, Utah. It was built in 1925 by the Upton Masonry Company, with a "somewhat ornate brick exterior." It has been listed on the National Register of Historic Places since December 31, 1987.

References

		
National Register of Historic Places in Weber County, Utah
Residential buildings completed in 1925
1925 establishments in Utah
Buildings and structures in Ogden, Utah